Sir Allan Fitzgerald Laurent Louisy  (5 September 1916 – 2 March 2011) was the second prime minister of independent St Lucia, following Sir John Compton in office. He was born in Laborie on 5 September 1916 and served as a judge before being elected to parliament in 1974.

In the 1979 general elections, Louisy became Prime Minister following the Saint Lucia Labour Party (SLP) victory.

He was succeeded as Prime Minister by Winston Cenac. After retiring from politics, Sir Allan Louisy continued working as a consultant and as a lawyer. He was also actively involved in the trade union movement.  

In his later years, he retired to his home in Saphyr Estate, and continued to spend his time volunteering in Laborie. He was knighted on 31 March 2005, recognizing all his accomplishments and benevolence during his lifetime.

He died on 2 March 2011 at home, surrounded by family.

See also
 Saint Lucia Labour Party
 Politics of Saint Lucia
 List of prime ministers of Saint Lucia

References

External links
 Office of the Prime Minister of Saint Lucia
 Biography available in Prime Ministers of Saint Lucia

1916 births
2011 deaths
Knights Commander of the Order of St Michael and St George
Members of the Privy Council of the United Kingdom
People from Laborie Quarter
Prime Ministers of Saint Lucia
Saint Lucian judges
Saint Lucia Labour Party politicians